Stump Rock is a rock lying close offshore in the west portion of King George Bay, 0.5 nautical miles (0.9 km) northwest of Martello Tower, in the South Shetland Islands. Charted and named during 1937 by DI personnel on the Discovery II.

References

Rock formations of Antarctica